Listen Lester may refer to:

 Listen Lester (play) 1918 play featuring Clifton Webb
 Listen Lester (film), 1924 silent film based on the play